Gudavi Bird Sanctuary is a tourist destination  in Malenadu region of Karnataka, Sanctuary is spread over an area of 0.74 square km.
It is part of Soraba Taluk of Shivamogga district in Karnataka.

As per a 2009 survey, 217 different species of birds belonging to 48 families are found at this place.

A natural lake and the trees gives shelter to these birds. It is a small seasonal lake and is filled with water mostly in the rainy season. Various avian species migrate from across the globe in different seasons for breeding. A platform is built for bird watchers to have a closer look at the birds.

Variety of birds 

    Grey heron
    Night heron
    Little cormorant
    Grey junglefowl
    Indian pond heron
    Darter
    Indian shag
    Little grebe
    White ibis
    Pariah kite
    Brahminy kite
    Eurasian spoonbill

Accessibility
Nearest City
 Sirsi (38 km)
 Nearest towns:
 Banavasi (15 km)
 Soraba(16 km)
Siddapura (25 km)
 Nearest train station: 
Talaguppa (42 km)
 Nearest airport: 
 Hubli (165 km)

See also

Sirsi Marikamba Temple
Yana
Gudnapur Lake

References 

Bird sanctuaries of Karnataka
Shimoga district
Protected areas with year of establishment missing